Mikaela Patterson (born 28 October 1996) is an Australian field hockey player.

Patterson was part of the Australian junior national team, the 'Jillaroos', at the 2016 Junior World Cup where the team won bronze.

In 2017, Patterson made her senior international debut for Australia in a test series against Japan in Adelaide, South Australia.

As of May 2018, Patterson is a member of the Australian women's national development squad.

References

External links

 

1996 births
Living people
Australian female field hockey players
21st-century Australian women